Francesco Danieli (1981 in Lecce) is an Italian historian and iconologist.

Life and activities 
He is known in the international scene, especially for his work on art and faith in Tridentine Italy and his study on Philip Neri and his aesthetic experience.
Danieli studied Philosophy, Theology, Archaeology, Art and History in Naples and Rome. He is Director of Gli Argonauti, series of publications by Edizioni Universitarie Romane (Rome). He has been involved in various international research projects and conferences. His extensive publication record includes books, essays, reviews, and newspaper columns.He is also an esteemed painter, whose original technique mainly consists of coffee watercolors.

Selected bibliography
S. Francesco d’Assisi in un codice bizantino del sec. XV, Galatina, Congedo, 2005.
Il mistero dei segni, Galatina, Congedo, 2007.
La freccia e la palma. San Sebastiano fra storia e pittura con 100 capolavori dell’arte, Rome, Edizioni Universitarie Romane, 2007.
Laudario dei semplici, Rome, Edizioni Universitarie Romane, 2008.
San Filippo Neri. La nascita dell’Oratorio e lo sviluppo dell’arte cristiana al tempo della riforma, Cinisello Balsamo, San Paolo, 2009.
Fasti e linguaggi sacri. Il barocco leccese tra riforma e controriforma, Lecce, Grifo, 2014.
Casaranello and its mosaic. Per aspera ad astra, Monteroni di Lecce, Esperidi, 2018.
A Journey of the Soul. Catharsis and Salvation in the Mosaic of Casaranello (Italy, 6th Century), in American Journal of Art and Design. Vol. 6, No. 3, New York, 2021, pp. 84-94.Echi danteschi e onirismo fiammingo in un dipinto di Donato Antonio D'Orlando (1562-1622)'', Rome, Edizioni Universitarie Romane, 2022.

Notes

21st-century Italian historians
1981 births
Living people